Châteauneuf-d'Entraunes is a commune in the Alpes-Maritimes department in southeastern France. It is situated in the Val d'Entraunes, the upper valley of the river Var. It lies partly within the Mercantour National Park. The church of Saint-Nicolas houses a 16th-century altarpiece, attributed to François Bréa.

Population

See also
Communes of the Alpes-Maritimes department

References

Communes of Alpes-Maritimes
Alpes-Maritimes communes articles needing translation from French Wikipedia